The Campbelltown Performing Arts High School (abbreviated as CPAHS) is a government-funded co-educational comprehensive and specialist secondary day school with speciality in performing arts,  located in Campbelltown, a suburb in south-western Sydney, New South Wales, Australia.

Founded in 1954, CPAHS educates approximately 1,000 students from Year 7 to Year 12 who have enrolled based on local residence and/or selectively in the performing arts division. The school's education curriculum and examinations are governed by the New South Wales Education Standards Authority, a government agency initiative under the administration of the New South Wales Department of Education.

Notable alumni

Tim Campbellactor
Bruce Quickathlete and Olympian
Jai Waetfordpop singer, songwriter and actor
Lisa Wilkinsonjournalist and TV presenter

See also 

 List of government schools in New South Wales
 List of creative and performing arts high schools in New South Wales

References

Creative and performing arts high schools in New South Wales
Educational institutions established in 1954
Public high schools in Sydney
Campbelltown, New South Wales
1954 establishments in Australia